Hibarigaoka Station is the name of two train stations in Japan:

 Hibarigaoka Station (Hokkaido) (ひばりが丘駅) in Hokkaido
 Hibarigaoka Station (Tokyo) (ひばりヶ丘駅) in Tokyo